Gleierbach (also: Gleiebach) is a river in North Rhine-Westphalia, Germany. It is a tributary of the Lenne, which it joins in Gleierbrück, part of Lennestadt.

See also
List of rivers of North Rhine-Westphalia

References

Rivers of North Rhine-Westphalia
Rivers of Germany